AFCH may refer to one of the following English association football clubs:

 A.F.C. Hayes
 A.F.C. Hornchurch